The 2017–18 Akron Zips women's basketball team represents the University of Akron during the 2017–18 NCAA Division I women's basketball season. The Zips, led by twelfth year head coach Jodi Kest, play their home games at the James A. Rhodes Arena as members of the East Division of the Mid-American Conference. They finished the season 9–21, 3–15 in MAC play to finish in a tie for last place in the East Division. They lost in the first round of the MAC women's tournament to Ohio.

On April 21, Jodi Kest announced her retirement after 12 seasons at Akron and 26 seasons as a head coach. She would finish with a 26 year record of 405–348.

Roster

Schedule

|-
!colspan=9 style=| Exhibition

|-
!colspan=9 style=| Non-conference regular season

|-
!colspan=9 style=| MAC regular season

|-
!colspan=9 style=| MAC Women's Tournament

See also
2017–18 Akron Zips men's basketball team

References

2017-18
2017–18 Mid-American Conference women's basketball season
2017 in sports in Ohio
2018 in sports in Ohio